Ni'iinlii'njik (Fishing Branch) Territorial Park is a territorial park located in Yukon, Canada.

See also
List of Yukon parks

References

External links
Official site

Parks in Yukon